Acleris japonica is a species of moth of the family Tortricidae. It is found in Japan.

The wingspan is 13–17 mm.

The larvae feed on Zelkova serrata and Quercus acutissima.

References

japonica
Moths of Japan
Moths described in 1900